3 Ninjas: High Noon at Mega Mountain is a 1998 American martial arts film.  It is the fourth and final installment in the 3 Ninjas franchise.

Directed by Sean McNamara, the film stars only three of the original actors. None of the child actors from the previous films returned for this installment. Victor Wong is the only cast member to appear in all four films. It is also his final film before his death in 2001. It was filmed in Denver, Colorado at Elitch Gardens Theme Park.

Plot
During their summer vacation with their grandfather Mori, 14-year-old Rocky, 13-year-old Colt and 9-year-old Tum-Tum take a test on an obstacle course in pitch blackness. They manage to complete the course, yet fail to learn how to use their other senses, in place of sight. Later that night, Mori overhears Rocky and Colt planning on not returning the next year due to them growing older, leaving Tum-Tum for himself. Mori becomes depressed at this.

Returning home, Tum-Tum also becomes depressed after learning that his favorite TV show, Dave Dragon & the Star Force 5, is going off the air soon from cancellation and not even his favorite sandwich was made to cheer him up, which confuses his mother, Jessica. The next day, they meet a new neighbor, Amanda, who accidentally crashes her remote controlled helicopter into their house's window. To recompense, Jessica invites her for breakfast and to attend Tum-Tum's birthday party at Mega Mountain, an amusement park modeled after Six Flags. Once they arrive at Mega Mountain, Rocky goes to spend time with his girlfriend, Jennifer and her few friends, Veronica, Eric and Doyle while Tum-Tum convinces Colt to join him to watch the performance. While the kids are enjoying themselves, a master criminal named Mary Ann "Medusa" Rogers and her henchmen sneaks in and commandeers the park, disabling many rides and shutting the place down to hold the patrons hostage. Medusa and rest of her men infiltrate the park's command center operations as their secret base and she threatens the park's owner, Harry Jacobsons to pay the $10 Million dollar ransom in exchange for the park's guests safety. Meanwhile, Tum-Tum and Colt want to get an autograph from Dave until they witness and save him from being captured by Medusa's henchmen. Rocky rejoins his brothers and Amanda fending off the men after spotting them on the surveillance camera monitors. The boys and Amanda realize the park has been compromised and report Dave about it, who went into action. The boys and Amanda notice a radio to make contact with the emergency services, and the police and firefighters units are sent to investigate the park. However, Medusa and her men spots and ambush them, which causes the FBI to arrive at the park for backup. In retaliation, Medusa orders her Jamaican sidekick C.J., to increase the Avalanche ride's speed level. The boys and Amanda rescue the riders by fighting some of the few men with Amanda's special arsenals that she possesses while she overrides the ride control with her laptop.

Knowing that they will interfere with her plans, Medusa sends her three dim-witted nephews Carl, Buelow and Zed to capture them, but they are taken down by the boys, who uses the park's carnival game items and a ride with their ninja skills. Meanwhile, Dave sneaks into the command center, but is quickly discovered and captured by Medusa and her henchmen. The SWAT team arrives and attempts to enter the park, but are stopped by the mercenaries with their electrical fence trap. In the meantime, Amanda utilizes the park’s main control systems with her laptop to lock the ride access down with C.J. trying to wrestle the controls from her, but not before Medusa quickly accesses the Zinger roller coaster's emergency brake that stops the ride on the inversion. Dave tries to attack Medusa, but she stops and her men imprisons him in the middle of the roller coaster bottom with several guests.

Recognizing the picture of Rocky and Jennifer on the ride monitors, Medusa’s nephews capture and tie her to the bottom of the Zinger roller coaster loop tracks, at which Medusa threatens to crush her if they don’t cooperate. Rocky goes off on his own to rescue Jennifer. Medusa sends her second-in-command, Lothar Zogg out to capture the boys so they don't interfere. Afterwards, Dave, regaining his confidence, fights off the guards and liberates the hostages from the roller coaster bottom. Rocky arrives to rescue Jennifer, but he gets attacked by Lothar. After a fight that leads to both Rocky and Lothar ending up at the top of the roller coaster loop, Rocky knocks Lothar off with a yo-yo around his ankle to make him literally bounce out of the park and into the hands of the authorities that are stationed outside of the park. Rocky then manages to free Jennifer before Medusa releases the roller coaster that can crush both of them. Jacobson arrives via helicopter with the several bags of money to pay the ransom for Medusa, but Amanda manages to destroy the last bag with her remote-controlled helicopter, causing the money to rain down onto the park and with the guests snatches it all.
 
Amanda is quickly captured by Medusa, who escapes underground with the remainder of the money. When Dave fends off Medusa's ninjas, she knocks him out unconscious. The boys successfully manage to defeat some of Medusa's ninjas until she shoots all of the lights out on sight. After she darkens the halls, Medusa's ninjas fight the boys with their night vision goggles. Despite the disadvantage, the boys overcome their weakness in the dark with Mori's advice about using their senses. The boys successfully defeat Medusa's ninjas, in order to rescue Amanda, who is handcuffed next to a bomb that Medusa activates to destroy the park. They manage to free her, but they are unable to disarm the bomb, due to the short circuited power supply. They attach the bomb to a few oxygen tanks with Dave's help to knock off the tank's valves and send it off like a torpedo down to Medusa's escape ship where she and her remaining men dives from the ship before her ship explodes on impact. Alerted to the explosion, the Police arrives to arrest Medusa at the beach shore, who resigns herself to defeat.

Now hailed and commemorated as heroes, the boys give the credit to Dave Dragon, hailing him as the real hero, to the press media. After reuniting with their parents and grandfather, Rocky and Colt assure Mori that they will not be leaving their training. They also extend the offer to Amanda to come train with them on the following year and she gladly accepts. The film and series end with them all celebrating Tum-Tum's birthday.

Cast

Development
Filming began in 1996. Hulk Hogan, wrestling in World Championship Wrestling at the time, wore a wig for the film which resulted in him having a different hairstyle than his traditional bald look. As a result, he is seen in Halloween Havoc '96 with a similar hairstyle as he had in the film. Elitch Gardens Theme Park, the park at which it was filmed, underwent a complete remodel, with all the signs for the park and rides being changed and renamed for the film. However, there are a few times when the real ones are seen in the background.

Reception
The film had universally negative reviews and is generally considered to be the worst of the four in the series. On Rotten Tomatoes, the film has an approval rating of 0%, based on 7 reviews. On Metacritic, the film has a score of 44 out of 100 based on 7 critics, indicating "mixed or average reviews".

Joe Leydon of Variety wrote: "Only small children with limited attention spans will be impressed by the lackluster kung-foolishness".
Anita Gates of The New York Times says "things are sad when Hulk Hogan gives the most touching performance in the film". Gates calls the film "interminably boring" but concedes it is possible young children might enjoy it.

The film was later released in a trilogy set along with the second and third films in the franchise, and has since seen a nostalgic revival. Simon of "The Mighty 90s" called it "the most 90s movie you can watch", also stating it had the most complex and impressive fight scenes of the franchise.

References

External links
 

1998 films
1998 action comedy films
1998 martial arts films
American action comedy films
1990s English-language films
American sequel films
Brookwell McNamara Entertainment films
High Noon at Mega Mountain
Films about brothers
Films about terrorism
Films directed by Sean McNamara
Films set in amusement parks
American martial arts comedy films
Ninja films
TriStar Pictures films
1998 comedy films
American children's comedy films
1990s American films